Salauddin Mumtaz (1945 – 31 July 1971) was a military officer who fought for the Bangladeshi side in the 1971 Bangladeshi War of Independence.

He is honorifically designated Shahid ("martyr") for dying for the Bangladeshi cause, and was also posthumously given the title Bir Uttom, meaning "better among braves" in Bengali, the second-highest Bangladeshi award for gallantry. He is famous for one of his last quotes, "Yahiya (Pakistani Dictator) don't have the bullet to stop Salauddin", which eventually proved when after all efforts going into vain, the Pakistan Army had to use morter shell to stop bravely charging Salauddin.

Early life 
In 1945 Salahuddin Mumtaz was born in Mukterbari, a village in North Charipoor, Feni District. His grandfather was the Muslim zamindar of Akyab, Burma (Myanmar) and his maternal grandfather Moulove Abdur Razzak was a Member of the Legislative Assembly (MLA) of the then Bengal Legislative Assembly of British India. Shamsuddin Ahmed was his father, an advocate got his LLB degree from Aligarh Muslim University. Shamsuddin Ahmed started his law practice in Kolkata. Salahuddin, along with his parents when residing in Kolkata started his schooling. After the independence of Pakistan his family came back to Feni where Salahuddin completed his primary education from Debipur Primary School. He did his Matriculation from Feni Government Pilot High School. For ISc he studied in three colleges: Comilla Victoria Government College, then Doyal Shing College of Lahore and finally passed ISc from Feni Government College. When he was student of BSc at Feni College he joined the Pakistan Air Force; he later shifted to the Pakistani Army (Infantry Division) where he reached the rank of captain.

War of Independence

In 1971 Salauddin was posted in Lahore, the then-West Pakistan. On 3 July 1971 with an intention of leaving Pakistan to join the independence fight in Bangladesh, he crossed the river Monawara Tabi of Maral area and entered India. At that time Mohiuddin Jahangir, Shahriar and Anam were his companions. This incidence of leaving Pakistan had got wide coverage in the then world media. He reported to the overseas Government of Bangladesh High commission at Kolkata and joined the East Bengal Regiment. After coming from Pakistan he even did not meet his mother at Feni. He was sent to sector 11 of East Bengal Regiment which was in Teldhala Camp, Meghaloy, India.

The 'Z' force under the command of Major Ziaur Rahman was active on that place, Salauddin joined this force and was appointed Commander of "Delta" Company. He involved in a dangerous plan to attack Border Out Post (BOP) at Kamalpur. With an intention of reckoning the actual position of BOP of Kamalpur on 28 July along with Lieutenant Manna and others he visited the said BOP. During this visit they had to face two Pakistani patrol soldiers. Salahuddin had a fight with one of those soldiers. He with the help of Subedar Hai killed that Pakistani soldier and snatched his rifle. By this time firing also started from Pakistani side. Subedar Hai also snatched another rifle from the other soldier and that soldier was killed by Nayek Shafi. Along with those two rifles Salahuddin and his reckoning party came back to the camp.

Under the command of Commanding Officer Major Moinul Hussain Chowdhury, the attack of Kamalpure BOP was launched on 30 July (at night on 31 July), 1971. The attack was made with two companies, Delta and Bravo from the North – East of the enemy camp. Captain Salahuddin Mumtaz commanded Delta on the left and Captain Hafiz commanded Bravo on the right. Battalion 'R' group under Major Moin was as a backup force. Major Zia was present with group 'R'. As the troops were moving towards the enemy post, the enemy artillery started firing heavily. As a result, the progress of the two companies became slow and encountered demise. The troop of Salauddin continued moving forward and entered the outer perimeter of the enemy camp. This attack was so vigorous that Pak army had to go back from their front line position. Delta Company crossed Pakistan bunker area, entered in the community center near the BOP and started a very close fighting. Subeder Hai and his group came very close to the Pakistani minefield. Salahuddin was at the right side of that group. A bomb blast before Subedar Hai and he lost his hand. Salahuddin did not stop, he was chasing Pakistani soldiers. Though casualties were increasing, the Bangladeshi fighters made progress through the minefield. 

On 31 July 1971, Punjab Regiment of Pakistan Army fired two mortar shells on Captain Salahuddin Mumtaz and he was badly killed.

Recognition
In addition to his designation as a Shahid and Bir Uttom, a cantonment of the Bangladeshi Army is named for him: Shahid Salahuddin Cantonment (Ghatail).

References

People killed in the Bangladesh Liberation War
1945 births
1971 deaths
Comilla Victoria Government College alumni
Recipients of the Bir Uttom
Mukti Bahini personnel